Australian rules football attendance records

Regional

Australia
Note: Since the 1970s in Australia, many grounds have been reconfigured without standing room, which reduces maximum capacity.

Single matches
Largest home and away crowd involving at least 1 non-Victorian team – 76,995 (2019). AFL 2019 - Round 23  v  (MCG, Melbourne, Victoria)
Largest home and away crowd involving 2 non-Victorian teams – 62,586 (2007). AFL 2007 - Round 1  v  (Stadium Australia, Sydney)

By Australian State and Territory

The table gives official crowd figures only. In the case of the 1976 SANFL Grand Final, the official crowd of 66,987 was the number of tickets sold, but when the SANFL ran out they opened Football Park's gates for free and the crowd grew by an estimated 15,000.

Largest Crowd outside an Australian capital city – 49,109 (1952). VFL  v  (Kardinia Park, Geelong, Victoria)
Largest Crowd outside a metropolitan city – 20,971 – (2006). AFL  v  (York Park, Launceston, Tasmania)

State of Origin Representative Matches

 Victoria v. South Australia – 91,960 (1989). (MCG, Melbourne)

League Seasons
AFL – 7,594,302.  (2018).  Number of Games – 207. Average attendance – 36,692
SANFL – 1,090,164.  (1967). Number of Games – 104. Average attendance – 10,482
WAFL – 960,169.  (1967). Number of Games – 88. Average attendance – 10,911
VFA – 937,291. (1976).  Number of Games – 94.  Average Attendance – 9,971
TFL – 318,496.  (1967). Number of Games – 58 Average attendance – 5,491

League Single Round
AFL – 400,401.  Round 1, 2017.

International

AFL Premiership matches
 New Zealand - 22,546 (|2013).  v.  (Westpac Stadium, Wellington)
 China - 10,689 (2018)  v.  (Jiangwan Stadium, Shanghai)

Exhibition matches

AFL (VFL/AFL)
 Canada – 32,789 (1987). Melbourne v. Sydney (B.C. Place, Vancouver)
 Japan – 25,000 (1986). Carlton v. Hawthorn (Yokohama Stadium, Tokyo)
 United Kingdom – 18,884 (2005). West Coast v. Fremantle (The Oval, London) 
 USA – 14,787 (1990). Melbourne v. West Coast (Civic Stadium, Portland) 
 New Zealand – 11,666 (2000). Bulldogs v. Hawthorn. (Westpac Stadium, Wellington)
 South Africa – 10,123 (1998). Brisbane v. Fremantle. (Cape Town)
 United Arab Emirates – 6,102 (2008). Collingwood v. Adelaide. (Ghantoot Racing & Polo Club, Abu Dhabi)
 China – 7,100 (2010). Melbourne v. Brisbane Lions. (Jiangwan Stadium, Shanghai)
Other
 France – 700 (11 March 2006). Reading Kangaroos v. France (Perpignan)

International Tests

Notes
1. The International Cup carnival does not charge for admission, and crowd figures are estimates to the nearest 500 spectators based on total ground capacity.  These figures do not include International Rules tests between Australia and Ireland or tests played as curtain raisers to AFL matches.

2. The 49th Parallel Cup charged admission for the first time in 2007.

Domestic Representative Matches
 Ontario vs Quebec – 500

Notable crowds for leagues outside of Australia

Note: No international Australian Rules Football leagues currently charge for admission, and crowd figures are estimates to the nearest 500 spectators based on total ground capacity.

References

Australian rules football records and statistics
Australian football code crowds
Australian rules football-related lists